The Markland Locks and Dam is a concrete dam bridge and locks that span the Ohio River.  It is 1395 feet (425.2 m) long, and connects Gallatin County, Kentucky, and Switzerland County, Indiana.

The locks and dam were reviewed by the Board of Engineers for River and Harbours to replace the Ohio River locks and dams Number 35, 36, 37, 38 and 39. Then the project was approved by the Secretary of the Army on March 11, 1953. Construction on the locks began in March 1956 and they were placed in operation in May 1959. The dam construction began in April 1959 and was finished in June 1964.

Federal Power Commission granted a license for Cinergy to operate a hydroelectric power plant at the dam. Cinergy was later bought by Duke Energy. The plant has a capacity of 81,000 kVA.

On September 27, 2009, the 1,200-foot lock failed and the gates "mismitered" due to a solenoid malfunction. The lock was repaired and reopened on March 1, 2010. The 1,200-foot lock chamber remained closed for 155 days, but the 600-foot lock continued to lock traffic albeit with delays.

See also

List of crossings of the Ohio River
List of locks and dams of the Ohio River

References

External links
A Variety of Markland Dam Pictures are at Northern Kentucky Views

Dams in Indiana
Dams in Kentucky
Hydroelectric power plants in Indiana
Hydroelectric power plants in Kentucky
Buildings and structures in Gallatin County, Kentucky
Dams on the Ohio River
Buildings and structures in Switzerland County, Indiana
Energy infrastructure completed in 1964
Bridges completed in 1964
Transportation buildings and structures in Switzerland County, Indiana
Road bridges in Indiana
Road bridges in Kentucky
Duke Energy dams
Locks of Indiana
Locks of Kentucky
1964 establishments in Indiana
1964 establishments in Kentucky